"I've Seen All Good People" is a song by the English progressive rock band Yes, written by frontman Jon Anderson and bassist Chris Squire and recorded on their third studio album, The Yes Album (1971). The almost 7-minute song is in two parts; the first, titled "Your Move", was released as a single in 1971 which peaked at number 40 in the US, which helped the group build momentum. The second part is entitled "All Good People".

The tune uses chess as a lyrical, if incoherent, metaphor for navigating interpersonal relationships, and contains several allusions to the music of John Lennon.  It has received positive reviews from several critics and has been considered one of Yes's best-known songs, with AllMusic's Mike DeGagne stating that "the harmonies are resilient from start to finish" and that the track "still stands as one of their most appealing" works. Music critic Robert Christgau has also singled it out for praise.

Lyrics
The first part of the song, "Your Move", alludes to the game of chess as a metaphor for male–female relationships. Examples include the phrases "move me onto any black square", "make the white queen run so fast", and "the goal is for us all to capture only one".

A reference to John Lennon's work is in the lyric "send an instant karma to me", with "Instant Karma!" being a single released by Lennon in 1970. Another reference occurs just before the three-minute mark of the song, in the closing moments of "Your Move", where the chorus of Lennon's song "Give Peace a Chance" is sung by the backing vocalists under the main melody.
More generally, Anderson has stated that the line "'cause it's time, it's time in time with your time" was an attempt to say that he would "do anything that is required of me to reach God" and that he wants the listener to feel "in tune and in time with God."

Composition and legacy
In the studio recording on The Yes Album, the song opens with Jon Anderson, Chris Squire and Steve Howe singing the sentence "I've seen all good people turn their heads each day so satisfied I'm on my way" twice a cappella, in three-part harmony. This is followed by a solo intro by Steve Howe on a Portuguese 12-string guitar. Howe also sometimes plays the solo on a standard acoustic guitar. As the 12-string begins a repeated four-bar phrase, it is joined by bass drum as Anderson resumes singing the lyrics, solo and in three-part harmony. Dual recorders enter on the third verse. Finally, a Hammond organ joins them, playing the same chords as the laúd until the first part of the song ends on a loudly sustained and unresolved organ chord.

The second part, "All Good People", consists of many repetitions of the sentence "I've seen all good people turn their heads each day so satisfied I'm on my way" sung to the same melody as before, but over a driving country rock accompaniment, ending in a powerful vocal harmony and organ phrase which begins on a chord progression of E, D, C, G, then A. Each repetition of the verse is one whole step lower than the previous as the song fades out. Anderson has stated that he wanted to have the song develop quietly but then open up into a big grandiose, church organ sound.

Village Voice critic Robert Christgau called the song a "great cut", being one in which he thought Yes' "arty eclecticism comes together."

The song has been included on several compilation albums, such as 1981's Classic Yes and 2004's The Ultimate Yes, since its initial release on The Yes Album in 1971. It has been performed during many of Yes' concert tours, and appears on many of Yes' live albums. As of 2021, the most recent live album to feature the song is The Royal Affair Tour: Live from Las Vegas, which was recorded in July 2019 and released in October 2020.

Personnel
Yes
Jon Andersonlead vocals, percussion
Chris Squirebass guitar, backing vocals, bass pedals
Steve Howevachalia, electric guitars, backing vocals
Tony KayeHammond organ, piano
Bill Bruforddrums, percussion

Additional musicians
Colin Goldring – recorder on "Your Move"

Charts

References

1971 songs
Yes (band) songs
Songs written by Chris Squire
Songs written by Jon Anderson
Song recordings produced by Eddy Offord
Atlantic Records singles